List of CSI characters may refer to:

 List of CSI: Crime Scene Investigation characters; for information on the Las Vegas ensemble of CSI. 
 List of CSI: Miami characters; for information on the ensemble of the first CSI spin-off, starring David Caruso.
 List of CSI: NY characters; for information on the ensemble of the CSI: Miami spin-off, starring Gary Sinise.
 List of CSI: Cyber characters; for information on the second direct CSI spin-off's ensemble. 
 Minor characters in CSI: Crime Scene Investigation